The 1935 Copa del Presidente de la República Final was the 35th final of the Copa del Rey, the Spanish football cup competition. Sevilla FC beat CE Sabadell FC 3–0.

Match details

References
RSSSF.com

1935
Copa
Sevilla FC matches